Sándor Balogh, also known as Balogh II (Gyón, 18 March 1920 – Budapest, 6 February 2000) was a Hungarian football defender, who played for Újpest FC, as well as representing the Hungarian national football team, winning 24 caps between 1942 and 1950. He was a member of the Hungarian Mighty Magyars.
Balogh later went on to coach Újpest FC, Tatabányai Bányász, Miskolci VSC and Pécsi Dózsa.

Honours

Club 
 Újpest FC
 Hungarian League: 1945 Spring, 1945–46, 1946–47

International
 Hungary
 Balkan Cup Champions: 1947

Individual
 Hungarian Football Federation Player of the Year: 1945

References

External links
 Player profile at sportmuzeum.hu 

1920 births
2000 deaths
Hungarian footballers
Hungarian football managers
Hungary international footballers
Újpest FC players
Újpest FC managers
Association football defenders
Nemzeti Bajnokság I managers
People from Dabas, Hungary
Sportspeople from Pest County